The 2018 Milwaukee Brewers season was the 49th season for the Brewers in Milwaukee, the 21st in the National League, and 50th overall. On September 26, the Brewers clinched a playoff berth for the first time since 2011. They defeated the Chicago Cubs in the 2018 National League Central tie-breaker game on October 1 to win their first division title since 2011. They swept the Colorado Rockies in the Division Series to advance to the National League Championship Series, where they lost in seven games to the Los Angeles Dodgers.

Offseason

Season standings

National League Central

Record vs. opponents

Spring Training

Spring Training game log

|- style="background:#bfb
| 1 || February 23 || Cubs || 1:05pm || 2–1 || Burnes (1–0) || Álvarez (0–1) || Ramirez (1) || 1–0 || 4,489 || W1
|- style="background:#bfb
| 2 || February 23 || @ Giants || 1:05pm || 6–5 || Archer (1–0) || Snelton (0–1) || Uhen (1) || 2–0 || 7,610 || W2
|- style="background:#fbb
| 3 || February 24 || @ Angels || 1:10pm || 5–6 || Anderson (1–0) || Brown (0–1) || || 2–1 || 6,019 || L1
|- style="background:#bfb
| 4 || February 25 || @ Diamondbacks || 1:10pm || 5–1 || Chacin (1–0) || Greinke (0–1) || || 3–1 || 8,370 || W1
|- style="background:#bfb
| 5 || February 26 || Indians || 1:05pm || 7–6 || Frieri (1–0) || Marshall (0–1) || Davis (1) || 4–1 || 2,360 || W2
|- style="background:#bfb
| 6 || February 27 || Reds || 1:05pm || 6–3 || Brady (1–0) || Herget (0–1) || Burnes (1) || 5–1 || 2,291 || W3
|- style="background:#bbb
| 7 || February 28 || Giants || 1:05pm || 10–10 || || || || 5–1 || 2,428 || T1
|-

|- style="background:#bfb
| 8 || March 1 || @ Diamondbacks || 1:10pm || 6–1 || Suter (1–0) || Chafin (0–1) || || 6–1 || 6,763 || W1
|- style="background:#fbb
| 9 || March 2 || Mariners || 1:05pm || 2–4 || Rzepczynski (1–0) || Logan (0–1) || Mills (1) || 6–2 || 3,954 || L1
|- style="background:#bfb
| 10 || March 3 || @ Rockies || 1:10pm || 6–5 || Archer (1–0) || Castellani (0–1) || Wilkerson (1) || 7–2 || 8,909 || W1
|- style="background:#fbb
| 11 || March 4 || Indians || 1:05pm || 2–6 || Kluber (1–0) || Chacin (1–1) || || 7–3 || 6,355 || L1
|- style="background:#fbb
| 12 || March 6 || @ White Sox || 1:05pm || 4–6 || Dunning (1–0) || Williams (0–1) || Clark (1) || 7–4 || 3,954 || L2
|- style="background:#bfb
| 13 || March 7 || @ Royals || 1:05pm || 10–6 || Derby (1–0) || Griffin (0–1) || || 8–4 || 5,236 || W1
|- style="background:#fbb
| 14 || March 8 || Diamondbacks || 1:05pm || 6–11 || Bracho (1–0) || Wilkerson (0–1) || || 8–5 || 5,231 || L1
|- style="background:#fbb
| 15 || March 9 || Athletics || 1:05pm || 0–2 || Puk (1–0) || Gallardo (0–1) || Alcantara (1) || 8–6 || 4,990 || L2
|- style="background:#bfb
| 16 || March 10 || Rockies || 1:05pm || 9–2 || Suter (2–0) || Anderson (0–1) || || 9–6 || 7,592 || W1
|- style="background:#bfb
| 17 || March 11 || @ Indians || 1:05pm || 5–4 || Frieri (2–0) || Plutko (0–1) || Davis (2) || 10–6 || 6,048 || W2
|- style="background:#bfb
| 18 || March 12 || @ Dodgers || 1:05pm || 7–6 || Drake (1–0) || Culver (0–1) || Barnes (1) || 11–6 || 9,164 || W3
|- style="background:#bfb
| 19 || March 13 || Rangers || 1:05pm || 4–3 || Wilkerson (1–1) || Bush (0–2) || Beckman (1) || 12–6 || 6,236 || W4
|- style="background:#bfb
| 20 || March 14 || White Sox || 1:05pm || 11–3 || Chacin (2–1) || Fulmer (0–4) || || 13–6 || 5,497 || W5
|- style="background:#fbb
| 21 || March 15 || @ Rangers || 1:05pm || 5–6 || Martin (1–0) || Frieri (2–1) || || 13–7 || 6,762 || L1
|- style="background:#bfb
| 22 || March 16 || @ Reds || 1:05pm || 16–14 || Liz (1–0) || Floro (1–1) || || 14–7 || 4,736 || W1
|- style="background:#bfb
| 23 || March 17 || Rockies || 1:05pm || 4–3 || Davies (1–0) || Senzatela (2–2) || Griep (1) || 15–7 || 7,273 || W2
|- style="background:#bfb
| 24 || March 18 || Dodgers || 1:05pm || 7–3 || Anderson (1–0) || Banuelos (0–2) || || 16–7 || 7,178 || W3
|- style="background:#bbb
| 25 || March 20 || @ Rockies || 1:10pm || 4–4 || || || || 16–7 || 9,197 || T1
|- style="background:#bfb
| 26 || March 21 || Athletics || 1:05pm || 4–3 || Hader (1–0) || Alcantra (1–1) || || 17–7 || 4,371 || W1
|- style="background:#fbb
| 27 || March 21 || @ Mariners || 6:40pm || 4–7 || Leake (1–1) || Suter (2–1) || Vincent (1) || 17–8 || 6,846 || L1
|- style="background:#bfb
| 28 || March 22 || Royals || 1:05pm || 1–0 || Davies (2–0) || Karns (1–2) || Griep (2) || 18–8 || 6,173 || W1
|- style="background:#fbb
| 29 || March 23 || @ Cubs || 1:05pm || 3–4 || Chatwood (4–0) || Woodruff (0–1) || Hancock (3) || 18–9 || 15,831 || L1
|- style="background:#bfb
| 30 || March 24 || @ Athletics || 12:05pm || 10–5 || Chacin (3–1) || Casilla (0–1) || || 19–9 || 7,283 || W1
|- style="background:#fbb
| 31 || March 25 || @ White Sox || 12:05pm || 1–16 || Volstad (1–0) || Ramirez (0–1) || || 19–10 || 7,437 || L1
|- style="background:#fbb
| 32 || March 26 || @ Astros || 7:05pm || 2–5 || McCurry (3–0) || Hader (1–1) || Giles (1) || 19–11 || 20,276 || L2
|- style="background:#fbb
| 33 || March 27 || @ Astros || 1:05pm || 1–8 || Morton (2–1) || Davies (2–1) || || 19–12 || 18,917 || L3
|-

|- style="text-align:center;"
| Legend:       = Win       = Loss       = Cancelled/TieBold = Brewers team member

Roster

Regular season

Game log

|-style=background:#cfc
| 1 || March 29 || @ Padres || 2–1 (12) || Jeffress (1–0) || Cimber (0–1) || Barnes (1) || 44,649 || 1–0 || W1
|-style=background:#cfc
| 2 || March 30 || @ Padres || 8–6 || Drake (1–0) || Hand (0–1) || Knebel (1) || 31,513 || 2–0 || W2
|-style=background:#cfc
| 3 || March 31 || @ Padres || 7–3 || Suter (1–0) || Perdomo (0–1) || — || 35,106 || 3–0 || W3
|-

|-style=background:#fbb
| 4 || April 2 || Cardinals || 4–8 || Mikolas (1–0) || Davies (0–1) || — || 45,393 || 3–1 ||L1
|-style=background:#cfc
| 5 || April 3 || Cardinals || 5–4 || Jennings (1–0) || Leone (0–1) || — || 27,760 || 4–1 ||W1
|-style=background:#fbb
| 6 || April 4 || Cardinals || 0–6 || Martínez (1–1) || Chacín (0–1) || — || 27,674 || 4–2 ||L1
|-style=background:#fbb
| 7 || April 5 || Cubs || 0–8 || Lester (1–0) || Suter (1–1) || — || 24,310 || 4–3 ||L2
|-style=background:#cfc
| 8 || April 6 || Cubs || 5–4 || Albers (1–0) || Montgomery (0–1) || — || 37,758 || 5–3 ||W1
|-style=background:#fbb
| 9 || April 7 || Cubs || 2–5 || Strop (2–0) || Barnes (0–1) || Morrow (1) || 43,331 || 5–4 || L1
|-style=background:#fbb
| 10 || April 8 || Cubs || 0–3 || Quintana (1–1) || Anderson (0–1) || Morrow (2) || 39,282 || 5–5 || L2 
|-style=background:#cfc
| 11 || April 9 || @ Cardinals || 5–4 (10) || Albers (1–0) || Holland (0–1) || — || 35,189 || 6–5 || W1
|-style=background:#fbb
| 12 || April 10 || @ Cardinals || 3–5 (11) || Leone (1–2) || Hoover (0–1) || — || 35,220 || 6–6 || L1
|-style=background:#cfc
| 13 || April 11 || @ Cardinals || 3–2 || Guerra (1–0) || Wainwright (0–2) || Albers (1) || 35,814 || 7–6 || W1
|-style=background:#fbb
| 14 || April 13 || @ Mets || 5–6 || Matz (1–1) || Davies (0–2) || Familia (7) || 34,921 || 7–7 || L1
|-style=background:#cfc
| 15 || April 14 || @ Mets || 5–1 || Anderson (1–1) || Harvey (0–1) || Hader (1) || 40,965 || 8–7 || W1
|-style=background:#fbb
| 16 || April 15 || @ Mets || 2–3 || Familia (1–0) || Albers (2–1) || — || 26,035 || 8–8 || L1
|-style=background:#fbb
| 17 || April 16 || Reds || 4–10 || Castillo (1–2) || Suter (1–2) || — || 28,677 || 8–9 || L2
|-style=background:#cfc
| 18 || April 17 || Reds || 2–0 || Jennings (2–0) || Romano (0–2) || Hader (2) || 31,345 || 9–9 || W1
|-style=background:#cfc
| 19 || April 18 || Reds || 2–0 || Davies (1–2) || Mahle (1–3) || Barnes (2) || 27,343 || 10–9 || W2
|-style=background:#cfc
| 20 || April 19 || Marlins || 12–3 || Anderson (2–1) || Peters (2–2) || — || 26,087 || 11–9 || W3
|-style=background:#cfc
| 21 || April 20 || Marlins || 8–0 || Chacín (1–1) || Richards (0–2) || — || 28,233 || 12–9 || W4
|-style=background:#cfc
| 22 || April 21 || Marlins || 6–5 || Jeffress (2–0) || Tazawa (0–1) || — || 37,175 || 13–9 || W5
|-style=background:#cfc
| 23 || April 22 || Marlins || 4–2 || Guerra (2–0) || Smith (0–3) || Hader (3) || 37,015 || 14–9 || W6
|-style=background:#cfc
| 24 || April 24 || @ Royals || 5–2 || Davies (2–2) || Kennedy (1–3) || — || 16,555 || 15–9 || W7
|-style=background:#cfc
| 25 || April 25 || @ Royals || 6–2 || Chacín (2–1) || Hammel (0–2) || — || 13,389 || 16–9 || W8
|-style=background:#fbb
| 26 || April 26 || @ Cubs || 0–1 || Hendricks (2–1) || Anderson (2–2) || Morrow (5) || 37,197 || 16–10 || L1
|-style=background:#fbb
| 27 || April 27 || @ Cubs || 2–3 || Strop (3–0) || Jennings (2–1) || Morrow (6) || 35,579 || 16–11 || L2
|-style=background:#fbb
| 28 || April 28 || @ Cubs || 0–3 || Quintana (3–1) || Guerra (2–1) || — || 40,147 || 16–12 || L3
|-style=background:#fbb
| 29 || April 29 || @ Cubs || 0–2 || Chatwood (2–3) || Davies (2–3) || Morrow (7) || 40,895 || 16–13 || L4
|-style=background:#cfc
| 30 || April 30 || @ Reds || 6–5 || Woodruff (1–0) || Peralta (1–2) || Hader (4) || 9,536 || 17–13 || W1
|-

|-style=background:#cfc
| 31 || May 1 || @ Reds || 7–6 || Anderson (3–2) || Bailey (0–4) || Jeffress (1) || 12,933 || 18–13 || W2
|-style=background:#cfc
| 32 || May 2 || @ Reds || 3–1 || Miley (1–0) || Castillo (1–4) || Jeffress (2) || 10,346 || 19–13 || W3
|-style=background:#fbb
| 33 || May 4 || Pirates || 4–6 || Kingham (2–0) || Guerra (2–2) || Vázquez (6) || 32,869 || 19–14 || L1
|-style=background:#cfc
| 34 || May 5 || Pirates || 5–3 || Hader (1–0) || Kontos (2–3) || — || 32,720 || 20–14 || W1
|-style=background:#fbb
| 35 || May 6 || Pirates || 0–9 || Kuhl (4–2) || Anderson (3–3) || — || 38,285 || 20–15 || L1
|-style=background:#cfc
| 36 || May 8 || Indians || 3–2 || Suter (2–2) || Kluber (5–2) || Hader (5) || 35,314 || 21–15 || W1
|-style=background:#fbb
| 37 || May 9 ||Indians || 2–6 || Carrasco (5–1) || Guerra (2–3) || — || 26,345 || 21–16 || L1
|-style=background:#cfc
| 38 || May 10 || @ Rockies || 5–2 || Chacín (3–1) || Márquez (2–4) || Jeffress (3) || 31,093 || 22–16 || W1
|-style=background:#cfc
| 39 || May 11 || @ Rockies || 11–10 (10)
|Jeffress (3–0)|| McGee (0–2)
| Hader (6) || 36,139 || 23–16 || W2
|-style=background:#fbb
| 40 || May 12 || @ Rockies || 0–4 || Freeland (3–4) || Suter (2–3) || — || 35,408 || 23–17 || L1
|-style=background:#cfc
| 41 || May 13 || @ Rockies || 7–3 || Peralta (1–0) || Gray (4–5) || — || 40,453 || 24–17 || W1
|-style=background:#cfc
| 42 || May 14 || @ Diamondbacks || 7–2 || Guerra (3–3) || Corbin (4–1) || — || 17,390 || 25–17 || W2
|-style=background:#fbb
| 43 || May 15 || @ Diamondbacks || 1–2 || Bradley (1–1) || Williams (0–1) || Boxberger (12) || 17,914 || 25–18 || L1
|-style=background:#cfc
| 44 || May 16 || @ Diamondbacks || 8–2 || Woodruff (2–0) || Koch (2–2) || — || 16,762 || 26–18 || W1
|-style=background:#cfc
| 45 || May 18 || @ Twins || 8–3 || Suter (3–3) || Gibson (1–2) || — || 29,349 || 27–18 || W2 
|-style=background:#cfc
| 46 || May 19 || @ Twins || 5–4 || Hader (2–0) || Reed (0–3) || — || 30,182 || 28–18 || W3 
|-style=background:#fbb
| 47 || May 20 || @ Twins || 1–3 || Reed (1–3) || Williams (0–2) || Rodney (9) || 28,577 || 28–19 || L1
|-style=background:#cfc
| 48 || May 21 || Diamondbacks || 4–2 || Anderson (4–3) || Greinke (3–3) || Knebel (2) || 27,094 || 29–19 || W1
|-style=background:#cfc
| 49 || May 22 || Diamondbacks || 1–0 || Albers (3–1) || Koch (2–3) || Knebel (3) || 27,065 || 30–19 || W2 
|-style=background:#cfc
| 50 || May 23 || Diamondbacks || 9–2 || Suter (4–3) || Godley (4–4) || — || 29,237 || 31–19 || W3
|-style=background:#fbb
| 51 || May 24 || Mets || 0–5 || Matz (2–3) || Davies (2–4) || — || 33,803 || 31–20 || L1
|-style=background:#cfc
| 52 || May 25 || Mets || 4–3 (10) || Jeffress (4–0) || Gsellman (4–1) || — || 28,286 || 32–20 || W1
|-style=background:#cfc
| 53 || May 26 || Mets || 17–6 || Jennings (3–1) || Rhame (0–1) || — || 37,258 || 33–20 || W2
|-style=background:#cfc
| 54 || May 27 || Mets || 8–7 || Logan (1–0) || Blevins (1–1) || Knebel (4) || 39,715 || 34–20 || W3
|-style=background:#cfc
| 55 || May 28 || Cardinals || 8–3 || Suter (5–3) || Weaver (3–5) || — || 42,867 || 35–20 || W4
|-style=background:#fbb
| 56 || May 29 || Cardinals || 1–6 || Wacha (6–1) || Davies (2–5) || — || 40,982 || 35–21 || L1 
|-style=background:#cfc
| 57 || May 30 || Cardinals || 3–2 || Jeffress (5–0) || Tuivailala (1–1) || Knebel (5) || 33,133 || 36–21 || W1
|-

|-style=background:#fbb
| 58 || June 1 || @ White Sox || 3–8 || Avilán (2–0) || Anderson (4–4) || — || 20,004 || 36–22 || L1
|-style=background:#cfc
| 59 || June 2 || @ White Sox || 5–0 || Chacín (4–1) || Shields (1–6) || — || 29,281 || 37–22 || W1
|-style=background:#fbb
| 60 || June 3 || @ White Sox || 1–6 || Volstad (1–3) || Suter (5–4) || — || 25,338 || 37–23 || L1
|-style=background:#fbb
| 61 || June 5 || @ Indians || 2–3 || Kluber (9–2) || Guerra (3–4) || Allen (10) || 22,330 || 37–24 || L2
|-style=background:#fbb
| 62 || June 6 || @ Indians || 1–3 || Carrasco (7–4) || Anderson (4–5) || Allen (11) || 21,315 || 37–25 || L3
|-style=background:#cfc
| 63 || June 8 || @ Phillies || 12–4 || Chacín (5–1) || Velasquez (4–7) || — || 22,196 || 38–25 || W1
|-style=background:#cfc
| 64 || June 9 || @ Phillies || 12–3 || Suter (6–4) || Arrieta (5–4) || — || 25,304 || 39–25 || W2
|-style=background:#fbb
| 65 || June 10 || @ Phillies || 3–4 || Eflin (3–2) || Jennings (3–2) || Hunter (1) || 31,175 || 39–26 || L1
|-style=background:#fbb
| 66 || June 11 || Cubs || 2–7 (11) || Rosario (3–0) || Albers (3–2) || — || 37,578 || 39–27 || L2
|-style=background:#cfc
| 67 || June 12 || Cubs || 4–0 || Anderson (5–5) || Chatwood (3–5) || — || 35,459 || 40–27 || W1
|-style=background:#cfc
| 68 || June 13 || Cubs || 1–0 || Chacín (6–1) || Montgomery (2–2) || Knebel (6) || 39,822 || 41–27 || W2
|-style=background:#cfc
| 69 || June 15 || Phillies || 13–2 || Suter (7–4) || Arrieta (5–5) || — || 40,945 || 42–27 || W3
|-style=background:#fbb
| 70 || June 16 || Phillies || 1–4 || Eflin (4–2) || Guerra (3–5) || Neris (10) || 40,531 || 42–28 || L1
|-style=background:#fbb
| 71 || June 17 || Phillies || 9–10 || Hunter (2–0) || Anderson (5–6) || Thompson (2) || 40,985 || 42–29 || L2
|-style=background:#fbb
| 72 || June 18 || @ Pirates || 0–1 || Williams (6–4) || Chacín (6–2) || Vázquez (14) || 10,672 || 42–30 || L3
|-style=background:#cfc
| 73 || June 19 || @ Pirates || 3–2 || Peralta (2–0) || Taillon (4–6) || Knebel (7) || 14,152 || 43–30 || W1
|-style=background:#bbb
| — || June 20 || @ Pirates || colspan=7| Postponed (rain) (Makeup July 14)
|-style=background:#cfc
| 74 || June 21 || Cardinals || 11–3 || Suter (8–4) || Martínez (3–4) || — || 32,764 || 44–30 || W2
|-style=background:#cfc
| 75 || June 22 || Cardinals || 2–1 || Knebel (1–0) || Norris (3–2) || — || 36,275 || 45–30 || W3
|-style=background:#fbb
| 76 || June 23 || Cardinals || 2–3 || Mikolas (8–2) || Jeffress (5–1) || Norris (14) || 35,551 || 45–31 || L1
|-style=background:#fbb
| 77 || June 24 || Cardinals || 2–8 || Weaver (4–6) || Chacín (6–3) || — || 39,710 || 45–32 || L2
|-style=background:#cfc
| 78 || June 26 || Royals || 5–1 || Peralta (3–0) || Junis (5–9) || Hader (7) || 34,412 || 46–32 || W1
|-style=background:#fbb
| 79 || June 27 || Royals || 4–5 || Duffy (4–7) || Suter (8–5) || Peralta (2) || 38,436 || 46–33 || L1
|-style=background:#cfc
| 80 || June 28 || @ Reds || 6–4 || Guerra (4–5) || Garrett (0–1) || Knebel (8) || 20,347 || 47–33 || W1
|-style=background:#cfc
| 81 || June 29 || @ Reds || 8–2 || Anderson (6–6) || Romano (4–8) || — || 26,130 || 48–33 || W2
|-style=background:#fbb
| 82 || June 30 || @ Reds || 3–12 || Hernandez (3–0) || Zagurski (0–1) || — || 24,640 || 48–34 || L1
|-

|-style=background:#fbb
| 83 || July 1 || @ Reds || 2–8 || Harvey (4–5) || Peralta (3–1) || — || 18,483 || 48–35 || L2
|-style=background:#cfc
| 84 || July 2 || Twins || 6–5 (10) || Knebel (2–0) || Littell (0–2) || — || 31,353 || 49–35 || W1
|-style=background:#cfc
| 85 || July 3 || Twins || 2–0 || Guerra (5–5) || Odorizzi (3–6) || Knebel (9) || 32,375 || 50–35 || W2
|-style=background:#cfc
| 86 || July 4 || Twins || 3–2 || Jeffress (6–1) || Berríos (8–7) || Knebel (10) || 36,700 || 51–35 || W3
|-style=background:#cfc
| 87 || July 5 || Braves || 7–2 || Chacín (7–3) || Fried (1–3) || Jennings (1) || 27,557 || 52–35 || W4
|-style=background:#cfc
| 88 || July 6 || Braves || 5–4 || Peralta (4–1) || Foltynewicz (6–5) || Knebel (11) || 31,452 || 53–35 || W5
|-style=background:#fbb
| 89 || July 7 || Braves || 1–5 || Sánchez (4–2) || Wilkerson (0–1) || — || 38,813 || 53–36 || L1
|-style=background:#cfc
| 90 || July 8 || Braves || 10–3 || Guerra (6–5) || Newcomb (8–4) || — || 43,262 || 54–36 || W1
|-style=background:#fbb
| 91 || July 9 || @ Marlins || 3–4 (10) || Ziegler (1–5) || Knebel (2–1) || — || 5,996 || 54–37 || L1
|-style=background:#cfc
| 92 || July 10 || @ Marlins || 8–4 || Chacín (8–3) || López (1–1) || Burnes (1) || 5,624 || 55–37 || W1
|-style=background:#fbb
| 93 || July 11 || @ Marlins || 4–5 (12) || Hernández (1–5) || López (0–1) || — || 5,265 || 55–38 || L1
|-style=background:#fbb
| 94 || July 12 || @ Pirates || 3–6 || Taillon (6–7) || Miley (1–1) || Vázquez (21) || 17,858 || 55–39 || L2
|-style=background:#fbb
| 95 || July 13 || @ Pirates || 3–7 || Kingham (4–4) || Guerra (6–6) || Crick (2) || 21,431 || 55–40 || L3
|-style=background:#fbb
| 96 || July 14 || @ Pirates || 1–2 || Rodríguez (2–2) || Anderson (6–7) || Vázquez (22) || (Game 1) || 55–41 || L4
|-style=background:#fbb
| 97 || July 14 || @ Pirates || 2–6 || Holmes (1–1) || Suter (8–6) || Vázquez (23) || 24,474 || 55–42 || L5
|-style=background:#fbb
| 98 || July 15 || @ Pirates || 6–7 (10) || Anderson (1–0) || Jennings (3–3) || — || 17,583 || 55–43 || L6
|-style="text-align:center; background:#bbcaff;"
|colspan="10"|89th All-Star Game in Washington, D.C.
|-style=background:#fbb
| 99 || July 20 || Dodgers || 4–6 || Hill (3–4) || Williams (0–3) || Jansen (28) || 36,812 || 55–44 || L7
|-style=background:#cfc
| 100 || July 21 || Dodgers || 4–2 || Burnes (1–0) || Kershaw (3–5) || Knebel (12) || 36,242 || 56–44 || W1
|-style=background:#fbb
| 101 || July 22 || Dodgers || 2–11 || Wood (6–5) || Suter (8–7) || Ferguson (2) || 38,249 || 56–45 || L1
|-style=background:#cfc
| 102 || July 23 || Nationals || 6–1 || Chacín (9–3) || González (6–7) || — || 26,073 || 57–45 || W1
|-style=background:#cfc
| 103 || July 24|| Nationals || 5–4 (10) || Jennings (4–3) || Grace (0–1) || — || 33,990 || 58–45 || W2
|-style=background:#fbb
| 104 || July 25 || Nationals || 3–7 || Roark (4–12) || Peralta (4–2) || — || 37,586 || 58–46 || L1
|-style=background:#cfc
| 105 || July 26 || @ Giants || 7–5 || Hader (3–0) || Melancon (0–1) || Knebel (13) || 40,643 || 59–46 || W1
|-style=background:#cfc
| 106 || July 27 || @ Giants || 3–1 || Anderson (7–7) || Bumgarner (3–4) || Knebel (14) || 40,414 || 60–46 || W2
|-style=background:#cfc
| 107 || July 28 || @ Giants || 7–1 || Chacín (10–3) || Cueto (3–2) || — || 40,735 || 61–46 || W3
|-style=background:#fbb
| 108 || July 29 || @ Giants || 5–8 || Suarez (4–6) || Guerra (6–7) || Smith (5) || 41,312 || 61–47 || L1
|-style=background:#cfc
| 109 || July 30 || @ Dodgers || 5–2 || Hader (4–0) || Maeda (7–6) || — || 44,933 || 62–47 || W1
|-style=background:#cfc
| 110 || July 31 || @ Dodgers || 1–0 || Miley (2–1) || Buehler (4–4) || Jeffress (4) || 44,818 || 63–47 || W2
|-

|-style=background:#fbb
| 111 || August 1 || @ Dodgers || 4–6 (10) || Floro (4–2) || Albers (3–3) || — || 41,686 || 63–48 || L1
|-style=background:#fbb
| 112 || August 2 || @ Dodgers || 5–21 || Kershaw (5–5) || Chacín (10–4) || — || 45,087 || 63–49 || L2
|-style=background:#cfc
| 113 || August 3 || Rockies || 5–3 || Burnes (2–0) || Davis (1–5) || — || 37,751 || 64–49 || W1
|-style=background:#cfc
| 114 || August 4 || Rockies || 8–4 || Peralta (5–2) || Anderson (6–4) || Hader (8) || 40,524 || 65–49 || W2
|-style=background:#fbb
| 115 || August 5 || Rockies || 4–5 (11) || Oberg (7–0) || Knebel (2–2) || Oh (3) || 37,954 || 65–50 || L1
|-style=background:#fbb
| 116 || August 7 || Padres || 5–11 || Strahm (3–3) || Hader (4–1) || — || 27,664 || 65–51 || L2
|-style=background:#cfc
| 117 || August 8 || Padres || 8–4 || Chacín (11–4) || Kennedy (0–1) || — || 32,355 || 66–51 || W1
|-style=background:#fbb
| 118 || August 9 || Padres || 4–8 || Yates (4–0) || Knebel (2–3) || — || 39,041 || 66–52 || L1
|-style=background:#fbb
| 119 || August 10 || @ Braves || 1–10 || Gausman (6–9) || Peralta (5–3) || — || 36,519 || 66–53 || L2
|-style=background:#cfc
| 120 || August 11 || @ Braves || 4–2 || Burnes (3–0) || Biddle (3–1) || Hader (9) || 40,297 || 67–53 || W1
|-style=background:#fbb
| 121 || August 12 || @ Braves || 7–8 || Venters (2–1) || Jennings (4–4) || Minter (10) || 25,360 || 67–54 || L1
|-style=background:#cfc
| 122 || August 14 || @ Cubs || 7–0 || Chacín (12–4) || Quintana (10–9) || — || 40,441 || 68–54 || W1
|-style=background:#fbb
| 123 || August 15 || @ Cubs || 4–8 || Hendricks (9–9) || Guerra (6–8) || — || 39,619 || 68–55 || L1
|-style=background:#fbb
| 124 || August 17 || @ Cardinals || 2–5 || Flaherty (7–6) || Peralta (5–4) || Norris (24) || 41,630 || 68–56 || L2
|-style=background:#fbb
| 125 || August 18 || @ Cardinals || 2–7 || Mikolas (13–3) || Miley (2–2) || — || 46,040 || 68–57 || L3
|-style=background:#cfc
| 126 || August 19 || @ Cardinals || 2–1 || Chacín (13–4) || Gant (5–5) || Hader (10) || 45,334 || 69–57 || W1
|-style=background:#cfc
| 127 || August 20 || Reds || 5–2 || Anderson (8–7) || Bailey (1–11) || Jeffress (5) || 27,590 || 70–57 || W2
|-style=background:#fbb
| 128 || August 21 || Reds || 7–9 || Iglesias (2–1) || Jennings (4–5) || — || 29,467 || 70–58 || L1
|-style=background:#cfc
| 129 || August 22 || Reds|| 4–0 || Peralta (6–4) || Stephenson (0–2) || Jeffress (6) || 33,058 || 71–58 || W1
|-style=background:#cfc
| 130 || August 24 || Pirates || 7–6 (15) || Lyles (3–4) || Holmes (1–3) || — || 32,694 || 72–58 || W2
|-style=background:#fbb
| 131 || August 25 || Pirates || 1–9 || Taillon (10–9) || Chacín (13–5) || — || 40,622 || 72–59 || L1
|-style=background:#cfc
| 132 || August 26 || Pirates || 7–4 || Anderson (9–7) || Archer (4–7) || Jeffress (7) || 39,607 || 73–59 || W1
|-style=background:#fbb
| 133 || August 28 || @ Reds || 7–9 || DeSclafani (7–4) || Guerra (6–9) || Iglesias (24) || 13,242 || 73–60 || L1
|-style=background:#cfc
| 134 || August 29 || @ Reds || 13–12 (10) || Jeffress (7–1) || Iglesias (2–3) || — || 11,777 || 74–60 || W1
|-style=background:#cfc
| 135 || August 30 || @ Reds || 2–1 (11) || Soria (1–3) || Brice (2–3) || Hader (11) || 13,403 || 75–60 || W2
|-style=background:#cfc
| 136 || August 31 || @ Nationals || 4–1 || Chacín (14–5) || Roark (8–14) || Jeffress (8) || 30,676|| 76–60 || W3
|-

|-style=background:#fbb
| 137 || September 1 || @ Nationals || 4–5 || Holland (1–2) || Soria (1–4) || Miller (2) || 30,875 || 76–61 || L1
|-style=background:#cfc
| 138 || September 2 || @ Nationals || 9–4 || Woodruff (3–0) || Rodríguez (2–2) || — || 33,032 || 77–61 || W1
|-style=background:#cfc
| 139 || September 3 || Cubs || 4–3 || Jeffress (8–1) || Cishek (4–3) || — || 44,462 || 78–61 || W2
|-style=background:#cfc
| 140 || September 4 || Cubs || 11–1 || Miley (3–2) || Montgomery (4–5) || — || 37,269 || 79–61 || W3
|-style=background:#fbb
| 141 || September 5 || Cubs || 4–6 || Quintana (12–9) || Chacín (14–6) || Strop (12) || 37,427 || 79–62 || L1
|-style=background:#cfc
| 142 || September 7 || Giants || 4–2 || Hader (5–1) || Strickland (3–5) || Jeffress (9) || 30,916 || 80–62 || W1
|-style=background:#cfc
| 143 || September 8 || Giants || 4–3 || González (8–11) || Stratton (9–9) || Jeffress (10) || 40,686 || 81–62 || W2
|-style=background:#cfc
| 144 || September 9 || Giants || 6–3 || Burnes (4–0) || Bumgarner (5–6) || Knebel (15) || 35,388 || 82–62 || W3
|-style=background:#cfc
| 145 || September 10 || @ Cubs || 3–2 || Miley (4–2) || Lester (15–6) || Jeffress (11) || 38,471 || 83–62 || W4
|-style=background:#fbb
| 146 || September 11 || @ Cubs || 0–3 || Quintana (13–9) || Chacín (14–7) || Strop (13) || 37,017 || 83–63 || L1
|-style=background:#cfc
| 147 || September 12 || @ Cubs || 5–1 || Hader (6–1) || Hendricks (11–11) || — || 40,234 || 84–63 || W1
|-style=background:#cfc
| 148 || September 14 || Pirates || 7–4 || Burnes (5–0) || Archer (4–8) || Jeffress (12) || 39,482 || 85–63 || W2
|-style=background:#fbb
| 149 || September 15 || Pirates || 1–3 || Nova (9–9) || Davies (2–6) || Vázquez (33) || 37,358 || 85–64 || L1
|-style=background:#fbb
| 150 || September 16 || Pirates || 2–3 || Williams (13–9) || Chacín (14–8) || Vázquez (34) || 32,180 || 85–65 || L2
|-style=background:#cfc
| 151 || September 17 || Reds || 8–0 || Miley (5–2) || DeSclafani (7–6) || Woodruff (1) || 32,145 || 86–65 || W1
|-style=background:#fbb
| 152 || September 18 || Reds || 1–3 || Romano (8–11) || Anderson (9–8) || Iglesias (28) || 30,366 || 86–66 || L1
|-style=background:#cfc
| 153 || September 19 || Reds || 7–0 || González (9–11) || Harvey (7–9) || — || 33,443 || 87–66 || W1
|-style=background:#cfc
| 154 || September 21 || @ Pirates || 8–3 || Burnes (6–0) || Santana (3–4) || — || 19,243 || 88–66 || W2
|-style=background:#fbb
| 155 || September 22 || @ Pirates || 0–3 || Williams (14–9) || Davies (2–7) || Vázquez (36) || 23,070 || 88–67 || L1
|-style=background:#cfc
| 156 || September 23 || @ Pirates || 13–6 || Knebel (3–3) || Kingham (5–7) || — || 20,623 || 89–67 || W1
|-style=background:#cfc
| 157 || September 24 || @ Cardinals || 6–4 || Burnes (7–0) || Norris (3–6) || Knebel (16) || 36,508 || 90–67 || W2
|-style=background:#cfc
| 158 || September 25 || @ Cardinals || 12–4 || Williams (1–3) || Gomber (6–2) || — || 38,051 || 91–67 || W3
|-style=background:#cfc
| 159 || September 26 || @ Cardinals || 2–1 || Chacín (15–8) || Shreve (3–4) || Jeffress (13) || 40,644 || 92–67 || W4
|-style=background:#cfc
| 160 || September 28 || Tigers || 6–5 || Soria (2–4) || Alcántara (1–1) || Jeffress (14) || 44,770 || 93–67 || W5
|-style=background:#cfc
| 161 || September 29 || Tigers || 6–5 || Soria (3–4) || Stumpf (1–5) || Jeffress (15) || 45,520 || 94–67 || W6
|-style=background:#cfc
| 162 || September 30 || Tigers || 11–0 || González (10–11) || Turnbull (0–2) || — || 41,848 || 95–67 || W7
|-style=background:#cfc
| 163 || October 1 || @ Cubs || 3–1 || Knebel (4–3) || Wilson (4–5) || Hader (12) || 38,450 || 96–67 || W8 
|-

|- style="text-align:center;"
| Legend:       = Win       = Loss       = PostponementBold = Brewers team member

Postseason game log

|-style=background:#cfc
| 1 || October 4 || Rockies || 3–2 (10) || Soria (1–0) || Ottavino (0–1) || — || 43,382 || 1–0
|-style=background:#cfc
| 2 || October 5 || Rockies || 4–0 || Chacín (1–0)|| Anderson (0–1) || Jeffress (1) || 44,547 || 2–0
|-style=background:#cfc
| 3 || October 7 || @ Rockies || 6–0 || Burnes (1–0) || Márquez (0–1) || — || 49,658 || 3–0
|-

|-style=background:#cfc
| 1 || October 12 || Dodgers || 6–5 || Woodruff (1–0) || Kershaw (0-1)  || Knebel (1) || 43,615 || 1–0
|-style=background:#fbb
| 2 || October 13 || Dodgers || 3–4 || Baez (1-0) || Jeffress (0-1) || Jansen (1)  || 43,905 || 1–1
|-style=background:#cfc
| 3 || October 15 || @ Dodgers || 4–0 || Chacín (1–0)|| Buehler (0-1) || — || 52,793 || 2–1
|-style=background:#fbb
| 4 || October 16 || @ Dodgers || 1–2 (13) || Urias (1–0) || Guerra (0–1) || — || 53,764 || 2–2
|-style=background:#fbb
| 5 || October 17 || @ Dodgers || 2–5 || Kershaw (1–1) || Woodruff (1–1) || Jansen (2) || 54,502 || 2–3
|-style=background:#cfc
| 6 || October 19 || Dodgers || 7–2 || Knebel (1–0) || Ryu (0–1) || — || 43,619 || 3–3
|-style=background:#fbb
| 7 || October 20 || Dodgers || 1–5 || Madson (1–0) || Chacín (1–1) || — || 44,097 || 3–4
|-

Postseason rosters

| style="text-align:left" |
Pitchers: 20 Wade Miley 32 Jeremy Jeffress 39 Corbin Burnes 41 Junior Guerra 45 Jhoulys Chacín 46 Corey Knebel 47 Gio González 48 Joakim Soria 51 Freddy Peralta 53 Brandon Woodruff 71 Josh Hader
Catchers: 9 Manny Piña 15 Erik Kratz 
Infielders: 3 Orlando Arcia 5 Jonathan Schoop 14 Hernán Pérez 18 Mike Moustakas 21 Travis Shaw 24 Jesús Aguilar 
Outfielders: 6 Lorenzo Cain 8 Ryan Braun 16 Domingo Santana 22 Christian Yelich 23 Keon Broxton 28 Curtis Granderson
|- valign="top"

| style="text-align:left" |
Pitchers: 20 Wade Miley 27 Zach Davies  32 Jeremy Jeffress 33 Xavier Cedeño 39 Corbin Burnes 41 Junior Guerra 45 Jhoulys Chacín 46 Corey Knebel 47 Gio González  48 Joakim Soria 51 Freddy Peralta 53 Brandon Woodruff 71 Josh Hader
Catchers: 9 Manny Piña 15 Erik Kratz 
Infielders: 3 Orlando Arcia 5 Jonathan Schoop 14 Hernán Pérez 18 Mike Moustakas 21 Travis Shaw 24 Jesús Aguilar 
Outfielders: 6 Lorenzo Cain 8 Ryan Braun 16 Domingo Santana 22 Christian Yelich 28 Curtis Granderson
|- valign="top"

Detailed records

Farm system

The Brewers' farm system consisted of eight minor league affiliates in 2018. They operated a Dominican Summer League team as a co-op with the Cleveland Indians.

References

External links
2018 Milwaukee Brewers season at Baseball Reference
Milwaukee Brewers season Official Site 

Milwaukee Brewers seasons
Milwaukee Brewers
Milwaukee Brewers
National League Central champion seasons